Magnus Swartling (born 19 February 1970 in Uppsala) is a Swedish curler and world champion.

He won a gold medal in the 1997, 2001 and 2004 World Curling Championships, all three times with skip Peja Lindholm, and received silver medals in 1998 and 2000.

Swartling is European champion from 1998 and 2001 (with skip Peja Lindholm), and has received a total of seven medals in the European championships.

Swartling has normally played Second on Lindholm's team.

Swartling participated on the European team in the Continental Cup of Curling in 2002, 2003 and 2004. In 2003 he was top male (with 22 pts) in the singles competition.

In 1998 he was inducted into the Swedish Curling Hall of Fame.

References

External links
 

1970 births
Living people
Swedish male curlers
World curling champions
European curling champions
Swedish curling champions
Curlers at the 2002 Winter Olympics
Curlers at the 2006 Winter Olympics
Olympic curlers of Sweden
Continental Cup of Curling participants
21st-century Swedish people